The New Providence cusk-eel (Lucifuga spelaeotes), also known as the Bahama cavefish, is a species of cavefish in the family Bythitidae. It is endemic to the Bahamas, where it has been reported from a small number of marine blue holes, inland caverns and chasms. It is the only known cusk eel species that can occur in surface waters; all others exclusively live in the deep parts of the ocean, or in underwater caves. It was first described in 1970.

References

Bythitidae
Cave fish
Endemic fauna of the Bahamas
Taxonomy articles created by Polbot
Fish described in 1970